The 1990-91 Four Hills Tournament took place at the four traditional venues of Oberstdorf, Garmisch-Partenkirchen, Innsbruck and Bischofshofen, located in Germany and Austria, between 30 December 1990 and 6 January 1991.

Results

Overall

References

External links 
  

Four Hills Tournament
1990 in ski jumping
1991 in ski jumping
1990 in German sport
1991 in German sport
1991 in Austrian sport